West Branch is a community in Weldford Parish located on the West Branch River, 6.12 km SSW of Mundleville, on the road to Ford Bank on Route 470.

History

Notable people

See also
List of communities in New Brunswick

References

Settlements in New Brunswick
Communities in Kent County, New Brunswick